The following lists show's India's international rankings in various fields and topics.

India is a democratic country which got independent on 15 August 1947.

Demography

Society

Economy

Communications
The following rankings involving technological advances in communication are taken from the CIA World Factbook.

Sport

Entertainment

Politics

Military

Awards

Environment

Geography

Agriculture, fisheries and livestock

Cities

The list of cities with most skyscrapers taller than approximately 150 m ranks Mumbai second with 50 buildings behind Dubai.
The Globalization and World Cities Study Group and Network (GaWC), Loughborough University listed Mumbai, New Delhi, Chennai and Bangalore as emerging world cities.
 List of most polluted cities by particulate matter concentration lists several Indian cities highly.

Religion

Lists by country
List of international rankings

References

India